Strangler vs. Strangler is a 1984 Yugoslav Serbian film featuring elements of comedy, thriller and horror genres.

Plot
In the mid-1980s Belgrade finally gets its first serial killer: an awkward carnations seller named Pera Mitić (Taško Načić). Mitić is an overweight 48-year-old man who is in an Oedipus kind of way connected to his aging mother. His mother often punishes him when he does not sell any of the carnation flowers. His punishments include kneeling on nutshells while being slapped by his mother or being locked in the water tank. This is the reason why he starts killing every girl who refuses to buy his flowers. Mitić's character can be compared to Norman Bates's character and relationship with his mother.

After the first murder, mostly incompetent inspector Ognjen Strahinjić (Nikola Simić) starts the investigation. His attempt to catch the strangler by employing an undercover agent, Rodoljub Jovanović (Branislav Zeremski), ends up tragically. Strahinjić is a loner who lives only with his cat George, who is his best friend. He is a short man, with a thin mustache and is similar to Inspector Clouseau from the Blake Edwards's The Pink Panther series. The plot becomes even more complicated when a rock star Spiridon Kopicl (Srđan Šaper) obsessed with the strangler records the song "Bejbi, bejbi" ("Baby, Baby"), with his band VIS Simboli, dedicated to the strangler, which immediately becomes a nationwide hit.

Mitić, having heard the song, becomes delighted; he even strangled his own mother in order to hear it on the TV. While Mitić's number of victims becomes bigger, Kopicl is focused on Sofija (Sonja Savić) who is a host of a popular musical show on the radio. While attempting to strangle Sofija, Mitić gets on his way and while attacking her Sofija bites his ear in self-defence. Kopicl gets the credit of a savior and a hero and marries Sofija. On their honeymoon, in the climax of his obsession, Kopicl strangles Sofija while Mitić, dressed as his mother, observes. Mitić then enters the room and asks for his ear. Kopicl runs to an abandoned building where, after a struggle, hangs Mitić who bit his ear. In the end all of the crimes, including Sofija's death, are credited to the late Mitić. Kopicl, while getting his ear bitten hears a melody on which he composed a symphony inspired by the crime and, after the death of his father, marries his attractive stepmother.

Cast
Taško Načić as Pera Mitić
Nikola Simić as Inspector Ognjen Strahinjić
Srđan Šaper as Spiridon Kopicl
Rahela Ferari as Pera's mother
Sonja Savić as Sofija Mačkić
Radmila Savićević as Mica Mojsilović, an eye witness
María Baxa as Natalija
Pavle Minčić as Dr. Dobrica Kopicl, Spiridon's father
Žika Milenković as Inspector Gane
Branislav Zeremski as Rodoljub Jovanović
Dragana Ćirić as a girl
Dijana Sporčić as Evgenija Poslisković
Jelisaveta Sablić as Miss Dobrila Skara
Đorđe Nenadović as Impressio Oskar (as George Heston)
Dobrica Jovanović as Sofija's father
Velibor Miljković as a punk

External links and references

 
 Movie critique (Serbian source).

1984 films
1980s black comedy films
1980s comedy thriller films
1980s serial killer films
Yugoslav black comedy films
1980s Serbian-language films
Serbian black comedy films
Serbian thriller films
Serbian horror films
Films directed by Slobodan Šijan
Films set in the 1980s
Films set in Belgrade
1984 comedy films